Geoff Foster is an English recording and mix engineer, best known for his work on numerous film scores.

History
Foster joined George Martin’s AIR Studios in 1987 after graduating from Brunel University with a 2.1 degree in Electronic Engineering. In 1994, shortly after AIR made its historic move to Lyndhurst Hall, Hampstead, he was made Chief Engineer. Having trained under George Martin's engineers he came to prominence as an engineer himself collaborating with David Arnold on the film Stargate (1994) which broke Box Office records upon its release.

In 2000, his work with Björk was nominated for Academy Award for Best Original Song, Golden Globe Award for Best Original Song and Chicago Film Critics Association Award for Best Original Score.

In 2001, he received a Grammy for his work on Joni Mitchell’s acclaimed album Both Sides Now. In 2005, he received a Grammy for his work on the soundtrack for the biopic film Ray. In 2008, he received a Grammy for his work on the soundtrack for the film The Dark Knight

In 2002, he won a Golden Reel award for his work on the score of Focus

In 2007, Foster was taken on by the newly formed AIR Management after the sale of AIR Studios to Strongroom’s owner Richard Boote. Throughout 2010, Geoff has been an ambassador for Phillips Obsessed with sound product range. In 2011, he was awarded a "BASCA" gold badge for services to the music industry. In 2012, he won "Engineer of the Year" awarded by The Music Producer's Guild (MPG) In 2012, Foster worked on Life of Pi, which won an Academy Award for best score in 2013.

Foster's numerous film projects over recent years include The Dark Knight, Black Swan (film), Inception, Nocturnal Animals, Dunkirk and Elvis (2022 film).

Filmography
 Stargate (1994)
 Black Beauty (1994)
 Don Juan DeMarco (1994)
 When a Man Loves a Woman (1994)
 Jack and Sarah (1995)
 Last of the Dogmen (1995)
 Restoration (1995)
 Une femme française (1995)
 Gold Diggers: The Secret of Bear Mountain (1995)
 Mrs. Winterbourne (1996)
 Hamlet (1996)
 James and the Giant Peach (1996)
 Romeo + Juliet (1996)
 Star Wars: Shadows of the Empire (1996)
 D3: The Mighty Ducks (1996)
 The Peacemaker (1997)
 Robinson Crusoe (1997)
 Photographing Fairies (1997)
 Meet Wally Sparks (1997)
 Perdita Durango / Dance with the Devil (1997)
 Swept from the Sea (1997)
 The Wings of the Dove (1997)
 The Matchmaker (1997)
 The Visitor (1997)
 Tomorrow Never Dies (1997)
 Smilla's Sense of Snow (1997)
 The Other Conquest  (1997 / 2007)
 The Place of Lions
 B. Monkey (1998)
 Prince Of Egypt (1998)
 City of Angels (film) (1998)
 Cousin Bette (film) (1998)
 Great Expectations (1998)
 What Dreams May Come (1998)
 The Avengers (1998)
 The Bone Collector (1999)
 Summer of Sam (1999)
 Plunkett & Macleane (1999)
 The Loss of Sexual Innocence (1999)
 Pola X (1999)
 Dreaming of Joseph Lees (1999)
 Entrapment (1999)
 Eye of the Beholder (1999)
 Mickey Blue Eyes (1999)
 A Midsummer Night's Dream (1999)
 Ride With The Devil (1999)
 Wing Commander (1999)
 The War Zone (1999)
 The World Is Not Enough (1999)
 The Insider (1999)
 The Last September (1999)
 Dancer In The Dark (2000)
 Bamboozled (2000)
 Born Romantic (2000)
 Circus (2000)
 Jason and the Argonauts (2000)
 There's Only One Jimmy Grimble (2000)
 Lost Souls (2000)
 Mission: Impossible 2 (2000)
 The Beach (2000)
 Moulin Rouge! (2001)
 Mr In-Between (2001)
 Shrek (2001)
 Monkeybone (2001)
 Kiss of the Dragon (2001)
 Just Visiting (Les Visiteurs 2 ) 2001
 Comment j'ai tue mon pere (How I killed my father) (2001)
 The Others (2001)
 The Muskateer (2001)
 Die Another Day (2002)
 Close Your Eyes (2002)
 The Magdalene Sisters (2002)
 Changing Lanes (2002)
 Below (film)  (2002)
 Between Strangers (2002)
 About A Boy (2002)
 Focus (2002)
 Gangs Of New York (2002)
 The Quiet American (2002)
 The Ring (2002)
 Spirit: Stallion of the Cimarron (2002)
 Thunderpants (2002)
 Swept Away (2002)
 101 Dalmatians II: Patch's London Adventure (2003)
 25th Hour (2003)
 Hope Springs (film) (2003)
 The Sleeping Dictionary (2003)
 It's All About Love (2003)
 Ned Kelly (2003)
 Effroyables Jardins (Strange Gardens) (2003)
 The Boys From County Clare (2003)
 Love Actually (2003)
 Les Demoiselles De Rochefort (Re-Record) (2003)
 Pirates of the Caribbean: The Curse of the Black Pearl (2003)
 Secondhand Lions (2003)
 The Statement (2003)
 A Different Loyalty (2003)
 The Threat (Hotet) (2004)
 Silmido (film) (2003)
 The Order / The Sin Eater (2003)
 Octane (2003)
 Little Britain (14 Episodes) (2003–2005)
 Ray (2004)
 Tropic Island Hum (2004)
 Beyond the Sea (2004)
 Prince and Me (2004)
 One Perfect Day (2004)
 She Hate Me (2004)
 The Clearing (2004)
 Thunderbirds (2004)
 In My Father's Den (2004)
 King Arthur (2004)
 Alien V Predator (2004)
 Shark Tale (2004)
 Pooh's Heffalump Movie (2005)
 The River King (2005)
 Kingdom Of Heaven (2005)
 D'Artagnan et les trois mousquetaires
 Naboer / Next Door (UK) (2005)
 Ring 2 (2005)
 Madagascar (2005)
 Mother of Mine (Äideistä parhain) (2005)
 All the Invisible Children (2005)
 Stoned (2005)
 The Curse of the Were-Rabbit (2005)
 Magnificent Desolation: Walking on the Moon 3D (2005)
 Asylum (2005)
 The Rocket Post (2006)
 Mrs Henderson Presents (2006)
 Renaissance (2006)
 Half Light (2006)
 Batman Begins (2006)
 The Thief Lord (2006)
 Doom (2005)
 Curious George (film)  (2006)
 Copying Beethoven (2006)
 When a Stranger Calls (2006)
 The Fountain (2006)
 Free Jimmy (2006)
 The Da Vinci Code (film) (2006)
 The Last King of Scotland (2006)
 Open Season (2006)
 Pirates of the Caribbean: Dead Man's Chest (2006)
 Astronaut Farmer (2006)
 Amazing Grace (2006)
 World Trade Center (2006)
 Smoking Aces (2006)
 Windkracht 10: Koksijde Rescue (2006)
 Casino Royale (2006)
 Blood Diamond (2006)
 The Year Of The Wolf (Suden Vuosi) (2007)
 Hot Fuzz (2007)
 Quest for a heart (Rölli) (2007)
 Elvis and Anabelle (2007)
 A Secret (2007)
 Daddy Day Camp (2007)
 Pirates of the Caribbean: At World's End (2007)
 Lady Godiva (2007)
 The Water Horse (2007)
 Arn – The Knight Templar (2007)
 Bee Movie (2007)
 The Great Debators (2007)
 Transformers (2007)
 Sweeney Todd: The Demon Barber of Fleet Street (2007)
 Fly Me to The Moon (2008)
 Mongol (2008)
 Elizabeth: The Golden Age (2008)
 10,000 BC
 Definitely, Maybe (2008)
 Alien Love Triangle (2008)
 Caught in the Act (2008)
 How to Lose Friends & Alienate People (2008)
 Iron Man (2008)
 My Zinc Bed (2008)
 The Dark Knight (2008)
 The Wrestler (2008)
 Madagascar: Escape 2 Africa (2008)
 Quantum of Solace (2008)
 An American Girl: Chrissa Stands Strong (Girl of the Year) (2009)
 Angels & Demons (2009)
 Moon (2009)
 Blood: The Last Vampire (2009)
 State of Play (2009)
 Rebound (2009)
 Farewell (L'affaire Farewell) (2009)
  The Invention of Lying (This Side of The Truth) (2009)
 Sherlock Holmes (2009)
 Transformers: Revenge of the Fallen (2009)
 Last Night (2010)
 Sammy's Adventures: The Secret Passage (2010)
 The Book of Eli (2010)
 The Italian Key (2011)
 Made in Dagenham (2010)
 One Night In Jordan: A Concert For Peace (2010)
 Clash Of The Titans (2010)
 Inception (2010)
 Morning Glory (2010)
 Despicable Me (2010)
 The First Grader (2010)
 Love & Other Drugs (2010)
 The Chronicles of Narnia: The Voyage of the Dawn Treader (2010)
 Black Swan (film) (2010)
 Tron: Legacy (2010)
 Enthiran (2010)
 Faster (2010)
 Hella W (2011)
 Paul (2011)
 Rango (2011)
 United (2011)
 Pirates of the Caribbean: On Stranger Tides (2011)
 Beneath the Darkness (2011)
 Kull of Atlantis (2011)
 Captain America (2011)
 Ghost Recon (2011)
 Transformers: Dark of the Moon (2011)
 Immortals (2011)
 A Very Harold & Kumar Christmas (2011)
 On ne choisit pas sa famille
 (You Don't Choose Your Family) (2011)
 Sherlock Holmes: A Game of Shadows (2011)
 The Raven (2012)
 Dolphin Tale (2011)
 The Dark Knight Rises (2012)
 Contraband (2012)
 Red Lights (2012)
 Madagascar 3: Europe's Most Wanted (2012)
 Safe House (2012)
 The Great Gatsby (2013)
 Filth (film) (2013)
 And So It Goes (film) (2013)
 Kochadaiyaan the legend (2013)
 Evil Dead (2013)
 Prisoners (2013)
 RoboCop (2014)
 Le crocodile du Botswanga (2014)
 Pompeii (film) (2014)
 Noah (2014)
 The Legend of Hercules (2014)
 Kochadaiiyaan (2014)
 Interstellar (film) (2014)
 The Hundred-Foot Journey (film) (2014)
 Exodus: Gods and Kings (2014)
 Gone Girl (film) (2014)
 Penguins of Madagascar (2014)
 Muhammad: The Messenger of God (film) (2015)
 Dough (film) (2015)
 Strange Magic (film) (2015)
 Home (2015 film) (2015)
 Victor Frankenstein (film) (2015)
 The Little Prince (2015 film) (2015)
 High-Rise (film) (2015)
 Terminator Genisys (2015)
 Man Down (film) (2015)
 Snowden (film) (2016)
 Kung Fu Panda 3 (2016)
 Me Before You (film) (2016)
 13 Hours: The Secret Soldiers of Benghazi (2016)
 Emperor (film, 2016) 
 The Siege of Jadotville (film) (2016)
 Nocturnal Animals (2016)
 Bridget Jones's Baby (2016)
 Emerald City (TV series) (2016)
 La porta rossa (2017) 
 Ghost in the Shell (2017 film) (2017)
 The Boss Baby (2017)
 Dunkirk (2017 film) (2017)
 The Adventurers (2017 film) (2017)
 Loving Vincent (2017)
 Only the Brave (2017 film) (2017)
 Mute (2017 film) (2017)
 Wolf Warriors 2 (2017)
 Omerta (2017)
 The Mercy (2018)
 Mute (2018)
 Mary Magdalene (2018) 
 Hunter Killer (2018)
 Adrift (2018)
 Mission Impossible:The Fallout (2018)
 Out Of Blue (2018)
 Happy New Year, Colin (2018)
 The Kid Who Would Be King (2019) 
 The Warrior Queen of Jhansi (2019)
 Asura (2019)
 Oh Mercy! (2019)
 Balance, Not Symmetry (2019)
 The Art Of Racing In The Rain (2019)
 Judy (2019) 
 The King (2019) 
 Gemini Man (2019)
 Fanny Ly'd (2019) 
 6 Underground (2019)
 When Hitler Stole (2019)
 Summerland (2020) 
 The Stonghold (2020)
 Rebecca (2020) 
 Rebecca (2020) 
 In the Earth (2021) 
 SAS: Red Notice (2021) 
 Cruella (film) (2021)
 The Boss Baby: Family Business (2021)
 She Will (film) (2021) 
 No Time to Die (2021) 
 Elvis (2022 film) (2022)
 Ticket to Paradise (2022 film) (2022)
 Carmen (2022) 
 All Quiet on the Western Front (2022 film) (2022)
 She Said (film) (2022)
 Lamborghini (2022)
 Sharper (2023)

Discography
 Akin - Ates Ve Su
 Alisha's Attic - ‘Alisha Rules The World’ ‘Air We Breathe’
 All Saints - ‘Pure Shores’ (Soundtrack -The Beach)
 Amici Forever - Defined
 Andrew Lloyd Webber - Eng Album ‘Love Never Dies’
 Angelis - Angelis
 Bjork (compilation) - Surrounded
 Björk - Brodsky Quartet Union Chapel
 Björk - tracks Selmasongs (Soundtrack-Dancer In the Dark)
 Blur - ‘On Your Own’ (Soundtrack -The Beach)
 Cast - Magic Hour
 Cilla Black - Cilla’s World
 Coldstream Guards - Heroes
 Craig Armstrong - As If Nothing Works
 Craig Armstrong - Filmworks
 Craig Armstrong - Forthcoming Album
 Craig Armstrong - Pianoworks
 Craig Armstrong - The Space Between Us
 Crowded House - Together Alone
 Daniel Levi - L’Amour Qu’il Faut
 Dario Gand & Vanessa Quinones - ‘Voices’ (Soundtrack-The Beach)
 David Arnold - Shaken & Stirred (007 Title Songs)
 David Cassidy & Petula Clarke - Blood Brothers
 David Essex - At The Movies
 David McAlmont - ‘Surrender’ (Soundtrack-Tomorrow Never Dies)
 Debbie Gibson - Think With Your Heart
 Deborah Harry (with John Williams) - Debravation
 Desree - ‘Im Kissing You’ (Soundtrack-Romeo & Juliet)
 Eliza Carthay - Angels & Cigarettes
 Elkie Brooks & Royal Philharmonic - Amazing
 Enrique Iglesias & Lionel Richie - ‘To Love A Woman’
 Era - Very Best of Era
 Eros Ramazzotti - E2
 Fat Les - ‘Vin-Da-Loo’
 Filippa Giordano - Ill Rosso Amore
 Fine Young Cannibals - ‘Tell Me What’
 Frederick - Piano
 Gallows - Just Because You Sleep Next Me.
 Garbage - ‘The World Is Not Enough (Soundtrack-The World Is Not Enough)
 George Harrison - Concert for George Harrison
 George Martin - In My Life
 Gilbert O'Sullivan - Caricature:The Box
 Gioaria - Like A Dream
 Grace Jones - ‘Storm’ (Soundtrack-Eye Of The Beholder)
 Hombres G - Esta Es Tu Vida
 Hombres G - Peligrosamente Juntos
 Hombres G - Peligrosamente Juntos
 Hothouse Flowers - Home
 Il Divo - Eng Album Siempre
 Il Divo - The Promise
 Irene Barnes - Time
 Jakatta - Visions
 Jethro Tull - Catfish Rising
 Jimmy Nail - Eng Big River
 John Martyn & Phil Collins - Couldn’t Love You More
 John Martyn & Phil Collins - No Little Boy
 Jon Hopkins - Art of Chill 2
 Joni Mitchell - Both Sides Now
 Joni Mitchell - Travelogue
 José Carreras - Hollywood Golden Classics
 José Carreras - José Carreras Sings Andrew Lloyd Webber
 José Carreras - Passion
 Kaiser Chiefs - Off With Their Heads
 Katherine Jenkins - Diva
 Katherine Jenkins - Living A Dream
 Katherine Jenkins - Serenade
 Killer Instinct - Soundtrack for computer Game
 Knebworth 90 - Live concert MTV broadcast
 Lance Ellington with John Wilson & his Orchestra - Lessons In Love
 Leftfield - ‘Snakeblood’ (Soundtrack-The Beach)
 Leona Lewis - Spirit
 Leona Lewis - ‘Moment LikeThis’
 Lesley Garratt - Platinum Collection
 Luis Miguel - Mis Romances Mis Boleros
 Madonna - American Life
 Madonna - Music
 Madonna - Die Another Day
 Maestro Hattori - Loe
 Maestro Hattori - Maestro
 Michael Ball - I Dreamed A Dream
 Mike Oldfield - The Millennium Bell
 Ofra Haza - ‘Deliver Us’ (Soundtrack-Prince Of Egypt)
 Paul Brady - Trick Or Treat
 Paul Carrack - A Different Hat
 Paul Potts - One Chance
 Peter Cincotti - East of Angel Town
 Petshop Boys - Nightlife
 Petshop Boys - Popart
 Petshop Boys - You Only Tell Me You Love When You’re Drunk
 Pope John Paul II - Santo Subito
 Pulp - We Love Life
 Radiohead - ‘Talkshow Host’ (Soundtrack-Romeo & Juliet)
 Rhydian - Rhydian
 Roachford - Get Ready!
 Robert Palmer - Ridin High
 Rockstar Supernova - Rockstar Supernova
 Ronan Tynan - Ronan
 Rory McLeod Footsteps And Heartbeats
 Rumer - Boys Don’t Cry
 Sandi Patty - Take Hold Of Christ
 Scott Walker - Drift
 Sean Ruane - Forthcoming
 Shayne Ward - Shayne Ward
 Shirley Bassey - Thank You For The Years
 Siphowo Ntshebe - Hope
 The Sisters of Mercy - Single ‘Dominion’
 Smash!! - Single ‘Freeway’
 Squadronaires - In The Mood:The Glenn Miller Songbook
 Stephen Duffy & Nigel Kennedy - Music In Colours
 Sting - Brand New Day
 Sugar Ray - ‘Spinning Mary (Soundtrack-The Beach)
 The The - Backing vocals Single ‘Beaten Generation
 Twentieth-Century Blues - The Songs of Noel Coward
 Various Artists - Voices From The FIFA World Cup
 Westlife - Love
 Will Young - From Now On
 Yusuf Islam - Forthcoming Album

Awards
 'Won:' Oscar Award - Music Original Score – "All Quiet on the Western Front" (2022) 
 'Won:' Grammy Award – Best Traditional Pop Vocal Album  – Joni Mitchell’s Both Sides Now (2000)
 'Won:' Grammy Award – Best Score Soundtrack Album For Motion Picture, Television Or Other Visual Media – Ray Official Soundtrack (2005)
 'Won:' Grammy Award – Best Score Soundtrack Album For Motion Picture, Television Or Other Visual Media – The Dark Knight Official Soundtrack (2008)
 'Won:' BAFTA Award – Anthony Asquith Award for Film Music – Moulin Rouge (2001) 
 'Won:' BAFTA Award – Anthony Asquith Award for Original Score – All Quiet on the Western Front (2022)
 'Won:' Motion Picture Editors Guild – Golden Reel Award for Film Scoring – Focus (2001)
 'Nominated:' BAFTA Award – Anthony Asquith Award for Film Music – Casino Royale (2006)
 'Nominated:' BAFTA Award – Anthony Asquith Award for Film Music – Inception (2010)
 'Nominated:' Grammy Award – Best Song Written for Motion Picture, Television or Other Visual Media – You Know My Name from Casino Royale (2006)
 'Nominated:' Oscar Award – Music Original Score – "The Prince of Egypt" (1998)
 'Nominated:' Oscar Award – Music Original Score – "Sherlock Holmes" (2009)
 'Nominated:' Oscar Award – Music Original Score – "Inception" (2010)
 'Nominated:' Oscar Award – Music Original Song – Björk "Ive Seen it All" (2000)

References

External links
 
 C/o AIR Management
 TC Electronics interview
 Philips "Obsessed With Sound" interview 1
 Philips "Obsessed With Sound" interview 2
 Philips "Obsessed With Sound" interview 3

1965 births
Living people
English audio engineers